Damien Raux (born November 3, 1984) is a French professional ice hockey forward who currently plays for Scorpions de Mulhouse in the Ligue Magnus.

International
Raux participated at the IIHF World Championship as a member of the France National team in 2010 and 2014.

References

External links

1984 births
Living people
Brûleurs de Loups players
Chamonix HC players
Diables Rouges de Briançon players
Dragons de Rouen players
Drakkars de Caen players
Ducs d'Angers players
French ice hockey forwards
Rapaces de Gap players
Scorpions de Mulhouse players
Sportspeople from Rouen